CFTI-FM is a half Mi'kmaq, half English radio station licensed to Elsipogtog First Nation, New Brunswick and can be heard at 101.1 MHz/FM. The station is owned by Native Broadcasting Ltd.

History
On November 28, 1994, Melvin Augustine (on behalf of a not-for-profit organization) received approval by the Canadian Radio-television and Telecommunications Commission (CRTC) to operate a new native-language radio station at Big Cove, New Brunswick on the frequency of 101.5 MHz. On February 25, 1998, the station received approval to change CFTI-FM's frequency from 101.5 MHz to 101.1 MHz and to increase the effective radiated power from 3 watts to 50 watts.

The call letters "CFTI" was a former callsign that was used at a radio station in Timmins, Ontario from 1976 to 1992 and is known today as CJQQ-FM. CFTI-FM/CJQQ-FM Timmins has no relation to the current CFTI-FM in Big Cove.

References

External links
 
 

FTI
FTI
Radio stations established in 1994
1994 establishments in New Brunswick